Cidade Nova Station is a subway station on the Rio de Janeiro Metro that services the neighbourhood of Cidade Nova in the North Zone of Rio de Janeiro. The station was opened in 2010.

References

Metrô Rio stations
Railway stations opened in 2010
2010 establishments in Brazil